This list is for characters in fictional works who exemplify the qualities of an antihero – a protagonist or supporting character whose characteristics include the following:

imperfections that separate them from typically heroic characters (selfishness, cynicism, ignorance, bigotry, etc.);
lack of positive qualities such as "courage, physical prowess, and fortitude", and "generally feel helpless in a world over which they have no control";
qualities considered dark traits, usually belonging to villains, (amorality, greed, violent tendencies, etc.) that may be tempered with more human, identifiable traits that blur the moral lines between the protagonist and antagonist.

Each of these examples has been identified by a critic as an antihero, although the classification remains fairly subjective. Some of the entries may be disputed by other sources and some may contradict all established definitions of antihero.

Literature

Film

Television

Anime and manga

Comic books

Video games

References

Lists of fictional heroes